Kevin Lock (born 27 December 1953) is an English former professional footballer who played as a central defender in the Football League, most notably for Fulham and West Ham United.

Club career 
Lock was born in Plaistow, Essex. He began his career with First Division club West Ham United as a ground staff boy in 1969. He made his debut against Sheffield United on 29 February 1972. After the departure of Bobby Moore in 1974, he broke into the team and was given Moore's number 6 shirt. Lock was a part of the team which emerged victorious in the 1975 FA Cup Final and had made 165 appearances and scored two goals by the time he departed Upton Park in May 1978. He dropped down to the Second Division to join Fulham for a £60,000 fee and made 233 appearances and scored 27 goals in seven seasons at Craven Cottage. Lock ended his career with Fourth Division club Southend United, after being signed by manager Bobby Moore on a free transfer. He made 11 appearances for the club, alongside another former Hammer, Frank Lampard.

International career 
Lock was capped by England at Youth and U23 level. He was named in the senior squad for a Euro 1976 qualifier versus Portugal on 19 November 1975, but remained an unused substitute during the 1–1 draw.

Coaching career 
Lock began his coaching career in the Southend United youth system and remained with the club after the appointment of David Webb as manager in 1986. He followed Webb to Chelsea as first team coach in 1993 and then to Brentford later that year. Lock served the Bees as caretaker manager during the 1997–98 pre-season and managed the team to a 3–0 defeat versus Millwall on the opening day of the regular season. After the appointment of Eddie May as manager, he moved to the role of Football Coordinator and departed Griffin Park in May 1998. It was his final job in football.

Personal life 
On Saturday 21 February 1981, Lock was the best man at Fulham teammate Tony Mahoney's wedding in Grays and the pair played for Fulham later that day. After leaving football in 1998, Lock entered the pub trade.

Career statistics

Managerial statistics

Honours 
West Ham United
 FA Cup: 1974–75

Fulham
 Football League Third Division third-place promotion: 1981–82

References

External links 
 

1953 births
Living people
Footballers from Plaistow, Newham
English footballers
Association football central defenders
Association football midfielders
West Ham United F.C. players
Fulham F.C. players
Southend United F.C. players
English Football League players
England under-23 international footballers
Brentford F.C. non-playing staff
English football managers
English Football League managers
Southend United F.C. non-playing staff
Chelsea F.C. non-playing staff
FA Cup Final players
Association football coaches